Nandi Awards presented annually by Government of Andhra Pradesh. First awarded in 1964.

1996 Nandi Awards Winners List

References 

Nandi Awards
1996 Indian film awards